Sharknado 3: Oh Hell No! is a 2015 American made-for-television science fiction action comedy disaster film and the third installment in the Sharknado film series, following Sharknado and Sharknado 2: The Second One. The film was directed by Anthony C. Ferrante with Ian Ziering, Tara Reid, Cassie Scerbo, and Mark McGrath reprising their roles from the previous installments. Also joining the cast are David Hasselhoff, Bo Derek, Ryan Newman (replacing Aubrey Peeples in the role of Claudia Shepard, from the first film), and Jack Griffo.

Irish music duo Jedward wrote and performed the film's official theme song "Oh Hell No", and also had a brief cameo in the film. In the film, Fin Shepard and his allies attempt to stop a group of sharknadoes that emerge along the East Coast of the United States, from Washington, D.C., to Florida.

The film premiered on Syfy in the United States on July 22, 2015. 

The fourth film, Sharknado: The 4th Awakens, was released on July 31, 2016.

Plot
In Washington, D.C., Fin Shepard (Ian Ziering) attends an awards ceremony at the White House, where he is given the Presidential Medal of Freedom by the President for his heroic actions during the 2013 and 2014 sharknadoes. When a tropical depression approaches D.C, a sharknado forms and attacks and destroys the nation's capital, killing the Mayor of New York City, White House Chief of Staff, and multiple Secret Service agents. Fin and the President work together to defeat the sharks, and the sharknado eventually evaporates into thin air, rather than having been taken down by force like before.

Worried that his pregnant wife April (Tara Reid), who is attending Universal Orlando with their daughter Claudia (Ryan Newman) and her mother May (Bo Derek), is in danger, Fin drives down the East Coast in order to reach Florida. En route, Fin encounters a "fognado", which is destroyed by his former employee Nova Clarke and her partner Lucas Stevens. Nova reveals that she and Lucas have been tracking sharknado activity ever since the events in 2013. Using a mobilized RV equipped with sharknado-destroying weapons, the two have been traveling the country destroying sharknadoes and saving lives.

Nova and Lucas realize that the numerous storms will soon combine into a massive sharknado wall that will destroy the entire East Coast. The trio drive down to the Charleston Air Force Base, where they acquire a fighter jet they'll use to get to Orlando. However, Lucas sacrifices himself in order to destroy an approaching sharknado. Nova and Fin destroy a sharknado approaching the Daytona International Speedway, causing their jet to crash land in the resort at Universal. There, a sharknado kills Claudia's friend Jess while Claudia and Billy, a random stranger Claudia befriended, escape and reunite with Claudia's family.

Fin, April, Nova, Claudia, Billy and May take shelter in the Universal Studios Globe at the entrance of the resort, which is carried away by a sharknado, injuring May. While she is taken to the hospital, the rest of the group escape Universal and seek the help of Fin's estranged father, former NASA colonel Gil Shepard. Fin approaches him at a diner and convinces him to help him with a risky plan to destroy the storm from space. The group reaches a NASA facility outside Cape Canaveral, where they plan to dissipate the storm by using a top-secret Space Shuttle to blow up large tanks of rocket fuel inside it.

Nova accidentally leaks to April that Fin is heading to space in the shuttle, causing her to confront him as he is getting ready to go on the flight. The sharknado wall hits the NASA facility just as takeoff is about to begin, killing Billy while he is fending off sharks with Claudia. Too late for April to return to the command center, she joins Fin and Colonel Shepard in their journey to space. Nova uses a fighter jet to create a hole in the sharknado wall, allowing the trio a clear entrance to the atmosphere. They launch into space where they detonate the external tank, but it fails to stop the wall of sharknadoes.

Colonel Shepard deploys "Plan B", activating a Reagan-era Strategic Defense Initiative satellite laser weapon, stranding himself in space since there is not enough fuel to propel all of them back to Earth. This time, the sharknadoes are destroyed, but the beam causes the sharks to propel into space, attacking the shuttle. Fin attempts to fight them off using an energy-beam chainsaw, but he and April are swallowed by two different sharks, which fall back down to earth. Fin and April emerge from the sharks unharmed, during which Fin discovers that April had given birth during the descent; Fin decides to name his son Gil.

As April recovers Fin's United States Astronaut Badge, a piece of the shuttle debris falls back down to Earth, seemingly crushing her to death.

Cast

Principal cast

 Ian Ziering as Fin Shepard
 Cassie Scerbo as Nova Clarke, a former waitress at Fin's restaurant
 Bo Derek as May Wexler, April's mother
 Mark McGrath as Martin Brody, Fin's brother-in-law
 Frankie Muniz as Lucas Stevens, Nova's partner
 Ryan Newman as Claudia Shepard, Fin and April's daughter
 Mark Cuban as President Marcus Robbins
 Jack Griffo as Billy, a guy who befriends Claudia at the theme park.

 David Hasselhoff as Gilbert Grayson Shepard, Fin's father and a former NASA colonel
 Tara Reid as April Wexler, Fin's wife

Supporting cast

 Blair Fowler as Jess, Claudia's friend
 Michael Winslow as Brian "Jonesy" Jones
 Michelle Beadle as Agent Argyle
 Ne-Yo as Agent Devoreaux
 Chris Jericho as Bruce the Hollywood Rip Ride Rockit Team Member
 Ann Coulter as Vice President Sonia Buck
 Melvin Gregg as Chad
 Christopher Judge as Lead Agent Model
 Grant Imahara as Lodge
 Lou Ferrigno as Agent Banner
 Lorenzo Lamas as Sergeant Rock
 Kim Richards as Babs Jansen, a Team Member at Universal Studios Orlando 
 Benjamin Bronk as a preacher
 Bill Engvall as Gary Martin Hayes, the White House Chief of Staff 
 Christopher Lambert as Arne Sleslum
 Cindy Margolis as Ms. Litella
 Kellita Smith as Sergeant Roberta Warren 
 Maria Menounos as C.J. Sorkin
 Keltie Knight as Alves
 Reza Farahan as a park police guard #1
 Robert Klein as the mayor of New York
 Anthony Weiner as NASA Director Regina
 Tim Russ as General Gottlieb
 Maryse Ouellet Mizanin as a park police guard #2
 Ryan Kerrigan as Technician Garber
 Renee Willett as Technician 
 Lonnie Magargle as Steve the Rip Ride Rockit attendant
 Rick Fox as Principle SSA Webb
 Ron Starrantino as Private Kelly
 Jerry Springer as Mr. White
 Ray J as Tom Major
 Genevieve Morton as a guest at the White House
 Penn Jillette as Lieutenant Colonel Stylo
 Teller as Major Caissier
 Joey Logano as himself
 Brad Keselowski as himself
 Kendra Wilkinson as Flo
 Bobak Ferdowsi as Matt Mason
 Holly Madison as Lieutenant Harrison
 Harvey Levin as Lester Williams
 Derek Caldwell as Airman Ray
 Josh Barnett as Sergeant Richards
 Max Kellerman as Airman Joseph
 Yasmin Yeganeh as Specialist Atkins
 Gerald "Slink" Johnson as Lieutenant Jared
 Darcy Demoss as an airman #1
 Jorge Bernal as Bernie
 Marcellus Wiley as Spl. Iverson
 Chris Kirkpatrick as a lifeguard
 Tom Compton as a reporter
 Michele Bachmann as herself
 Brian Mitchell as Technician Howe
 Jessalyn Gerbholz as a Universal parkgoer
 Kelly Colbourne as a Universal parkgoer
 Diana Terranova as the bride
 George R.R. Martin as himself
 Matt Lauer as himself
 Al Roker as himself
 Natalie Morales as herself
 Savannah Guthrie as herself
 Kathie Lee Gifford as herself
 Hoda Kotb as herself
 Elvis Duran as himself
 Alexis Ohanian as himself
 Jared S. Fogle as himself 
 Tony Pace as himself
 George H. Diller as himself
 Bill Davis as himself
 Doug Burdinski as Douglas Vortex
 Frank Kramer as himself
 Heidi Decker as herself
 Avalon Stone as Carly
 Juliana Ferrante as Juliana
 Anthony C. Ferrante as NASA Launch Director Marymee
 Petunia as herself

Cameos

 Erika Jordan as NASA Engineer Harleen Quinn
 Bruno Salomone as René Joubert
 Thunder Levin as Mr. Benchley from the Post
 Chad Johnson as NASA technician
 Jedward as a tourist
 Neville Southall
 Rhonda Rhodes as a shocked woman in the Universal Orlando scene.
 Oliver Kalkofe and Peter Rütten as rollercoaster patrons

Production
Sharknado 3 was filmed on location at Universal Orlando, São Paulo Brazil, Northern New Jersey, San Juan, Puerto Rico, and Washington, D.C.

The role of the President was written with former Governor of Alaska Sarah Palin in mind, but she declined. The part was then offered to businessman Donald Trump, but took time to decide since he was preparing a real presidential campaign. After production went ahead and cast Mark Cuban in the role, Trump responded angrily and threatened to sue to film.

Release

Critical reception
Rotten Tomatoes reports a 36% score with an average rating of 3.9/10, based on reviews from 33 critics. The consensus reads: "Sharknado 3: Oh Hell No! bites off more than it can chew, leaving viewers with an overlong mess that isn't even bad enough to be good." On Metacritic, the film has a score of 53 out of a 100 based on reviews from 19 critics, indicating "mixed or average reviews".

Brian Lowry of Variety said the self-reference gag was beginning to yield diminishing returns. He further added that the question is whether the parent company's insatiable appetite to cash in would hasten the feeding frenzy. Don Kaplan of The New York Daily News said the movie left a fishy taste behind. Neil Genzlinger of The New York Times said Sharknado 3'''s absurdities was turned to funny levels. He also said it was shameless in certain ways, with one being product placement. Matt Fowler from IGN said the film is surprisingly awful.

Tie-in merchandise
A tie-in one shot comic, Archie vs. Sharknado, was released on July 22, 2015, by Archie Comics. Written by Ferrante and illustrated by Dan Parent, it depicts a Sharknado striking Riverdale.

SequelSharknado 4 was confirmed to follow upon Sharknado 3s premiere. The film concludes with a cliffhanger leaving open the question as to whether April is killed by falling wreckage. An ad campaign that commenced after the film promoted a Twitter campaign offering fans the chance to decide her fate with the hashtags "#AprilLives" or "#AprilDies", with the results to be revealed in Sharknado 4. The fourth installment aired on July 31, 2016.

Crossover
A promotional trailer reveals that Ziering also makes an appearance as Fin Shepard in Lavalantula, which debuted on July 25, 2015, the Saturday after Sharknado 3s Wednesday premiere. This indicates that it takes place in a shared universe. As he says he has "shark problems right now", this may indicate that the events of Lavalantula take place just before or concurrent with Sharknado 3. Steve Guttenberg, the star of Lavalantula, appears in Sharknado: The 4th Awakens'', reprising the role of Colton West in cameo; Michael Winslow also appears in both films, but as different characters.

Notes

References

External links

 
 
 
 

2015 television films
2015 films
2010s English-language films
2015 horror films
2015 independent films
2010s science fiction comedy films
American disaster films
American science fiction television films
American science fiction horror films
Films about sharks
Films directed by Anthony C. Ferrante
Films set in amusement parks
Films set in Florida
Films set in Washington, D.C.
Films shot in California
Films shot in Florida
Films shot in Washington, D.C.
Films about shark attacks
Television sequel films
White House in fiction
Syfy original films
The Asylum films
Sharknado films
2010s American films